The North West of Ireland Cricket Union, often referred to as the North West Cricket Union, is one of five provincial governing bodies in Ireland. Along with the Connacht, Leinster, Munster and Northern unions, it makes up the Irish Cricket Union (now known as Cricket Ireland), the supreme governing body of Irish cricket.

The North West jurisdiction covers counties Fermanagh and Londonderry and part of Tyrone in Northern Ireland and Donegal in the Republic of Ireland. All of these counties are in Ulster, the northern province in Ireland. The Union organises the North West Senior Cup and the North West Senior League.

The Union was formed as the County Derry Cricket Union in 1890, changing to the current name in 1907 to reflect the wider geographical basis of its membership. In 2015, there were 23 clubs fielding 51 teams affiliated to the union. There are 6 divisions: two senior leagues-  premiership and a championship, along with 4 Qualifying leagues.

Premiership 2015            
-Ardmore                         
-Bready
-Brigade
-Coleraine
-Donemana
-Eglinton
-St. Johnston
-Strabane

Championship 2015
-Bonds Glen
-Burndennet
-Creevedonnell
-Drummond
-Fox Lodge
-Glendermott
-Killyclooney
-Newbuildings

Qualifying 1 2015
-Ballyspallen
-Bonds Glen 2nds
-Bready 2nds
-Brigade 2nds
-Coleraine 2nds
-Donemana 2nds
-Eglinton 2nds
-Fox Lodge 2nds
-Sion Mills
-Strabane 2nds

Qualifying 2 2015
-Ardmore 2nds
-Bready 3rds
-Crindle
-Donemana 3rds
-Limavady
-North Fermanagh
-St. Johnston 2nds
-The Nedd

Qualifying 3 2015
-Bready 4ths
-Creevedonnell 2nds
-Coleraine 3rds
-Drummond 2nds
-Fox Lodge 3rds
-Glendermott 2nds
-Killyclooney 2nds
-Sion Mills 2nds

Qualifying 4 2015
-Ardmore 3rds
-Ballyspallen 2nds
-Bready 5ths
-Burndennett 2nds
-Donemana 4ths
-Eglinton 3rds
-Killyclooney 3rds
-Maghera
-Newbuildings 2nds

Interprovincial Team
In 2013, Cricket Ireland formed the three-day Interprovincial Championship, featuring teams from Leinster, the NCU and the North West. The North West team is known as the North West Warriors. On 8 April, they announced Bobby Rao as their coach.

References

External links
North West of Ireland Cricket Union

Irish provincial cricket unions
 
Cric
1890 establishments in Ireland